Rahi may refer to:

Given name
 Rahi (goddess), a regional form of Hindu goddess Radha
 Rahi Chakraborty, a singer and songwriter from India
 Rahi Masoom Raza, an Indian writer
 Rahi Mo'ayyeri, an Iranian poet and musician
 Rahi Rezvani, an Iranian photographer and director

Surname
 Chander Singh Rahi, an Indian folk singer from Uttarakhand
 Bechara Boutros al-Rahi, Maronite Patriarch of Antioch from 2011
 Sultan Rahi, a Pakistani film actor
 Yamila Diaz-Rahi, an Argentine supermodel

Other uses
 The RAHI Foundation (Recovering and Healing from Incest), an Indian support organization
 Rahi (film), a 1952 Hindi film by Khwaja Ahmad Abbas, based on a Mulk Raj Anand story
 Rahi Badal Gaye, a 1985 Hindi film produced by Ravi Malhotra.
 Hum Hain Rahi Pyar Ke, a 1993 Bollywood movie
 Rahi (Lego), the animals and wildlife of Lego's fictional Bionicle franchise
 Rahi, Khyber Pakhtunkhwa - a union council (sub-division) of Abbottabad District in the North West Frontier of Pakistan
 Rahi, Raebareli, a village in Uttar Pradesh, India

See also
 Rakhi (disambiguation)